Andrew Wan Siu-kin (born 7 June 1969) is the former vice-chairman of the Democratic Party and a former member of the Kwai Tsing District Council for Shek Yam constituency. He was elected in the 2016 Hong Kong Legislative Council election through New Territories West.

Career
Born in Hong Kong in 1969, Andrew‘s ancestral hometown is Huizhou (惠州), Guangdong province. Wan graduated from the City University of Hong Kong with the Bachelor of Social Science (BSocSc) in Social Work and studied at the University of Essex from 2006 and graduated with Bachelor and Master of Arts in Sociology.

In 2002, he joined the pro-democracy Neighbourhood and Worker's Service Centre (NWSC) as the assistant of legislator Leung Yiu-chung and ran in the 2003 District Council elections, defeating the pro-Beijing Democratic Alliance for Betterment of Hong Kong (DAB) in Shek Yam and was re-elected in 2007. He partnered with Leung Yiu-chung in the 2004 Legislative Council election in the second place and helped Leung to win a seat the LegCo although he was not elected himself.

Wan quit the NWSC in 2008 and joined the Democratic Party in 2009. In the 2014 party leadership election, he was elected as Vice-Chairman of the Democratic Party.

In 2015 Hong Kong district council elections, he lost his seat in the Kwai Tsing District Council to newcoming Democratic Alliance for the Betterment and Progress of Hong Kong Li Sai-lung in  Shek Yam with a margin of 54 votes. He was elected in the 2016 Hong Kong Legislative Council election through New Territories West.

Arrests
Wan was arrested on 1 November 2020, along with six other democrats, in connection with the melee that had broken out in the LegCo on 8 May 2020. On that day, Starry Lee, the incumbent chair of the House Committee of the Legislative Council, had attempted to commence a meeting of the committee after extended stalling tactics of the pan-democratic camp over the previous months.

On 6 January 2021, Wan was among 53 members of the pro-democratic camp who were arrested under the national security law, specifically its provision regarding alleged subversion. The group stood accused of the organisation of and participation in unofficial primary elections held by the camp in July 2020. Wan was released on bail on 7 January.

Wan was charged with subversion on 28 February 2021 along with 46 others politicians and activists. On 25 March 2021, the High Court denied him bail and ordered back to prison until the next hearing on the case.

After he was charged with national security law, Wan announced that he decided to resign as Kwai Tsing District Council member on 11 May 2021.

On 28 May 2021, High Court judge Esther Toh upheld her decision that Wan had his bail denied, citing content on his computer that advocated for Hong Kong independence, and the formation of a group which called for international sanctions against Hong Kong officials who allegedly permitted "excessive police violence". This, the court argued, demonstrated a "persistent and strong devotion" to the agenda of subversion and secession.

References

1969 births
Alumni of the City University of Hong Kong
Alumni of the University of Essex
Living people
District councillors of Kwai Tsing District
Hong Kong social workers
Democratic Party (Hong Kong) politicians
HK LegCo Members 2016–2021
Hong Kong political prisoners